Tadoba Express is an express train of the Indian Railways connecting  in Maharashtra and  of Telangana. It is currently being operated with 15603/15604 train numbers on a daily basis. It is named after Tadoba Andhari Tiger Project.

Service

11083/Tadoba Weekly Express has an average speed of 42 km/hr and covers 1153 km in 27 hrs 30 mins. 
11084/Tadoba Weekly Express has an average speed of 39 km/hr and covers 1153 km in 29 hrs 30 mins.

Route and halts 

The important halts of the train are:

Coach composition

The train consists of 15 coaches:

 1 AC II Tier
 3 AC III Tier
 6 Sleeper coaches
 3 General
 2 Second-class Luggage/parcel van

Traction

Both trains are hauled by a Kalyan Loco Shed-based WDP-4 diesel locomotive from Kurla to Kazipet.

Notes

External links 

 11083/Tadoba Weekly Express India Rail Info
 11084/Tadoba Weekly Express India Rail Info

References 

Named passenger trains of India
Rail transport in Maharashtra
Rail transport in Telangana
Transport in Mumbai
Railway services introduced in 2016
Express trains in India